Birgül Sadıkoğlu (born March 23, 2000) is a Turkish women's football midfielder,  who plays in the Turkish Women's Football Super League for Galatasaray.

She played for the Turkey U-17 and U-19 teams before she became a member of the Turkey national team.

She graduated from a vocational technical and industrial high school in Eskişehir.

Playing career 
She played football in her school's football team. In 2013, she became top scorer with five goals in the Turkish Intra-school Cadets Football Championship held in Kastamonu.

Club career 

Birgül Sadıkoğlu obtained her license on May 31, 2012, and entered Eskişehirspor in her hometown.

She became Top scorer at the 2013 Turkish Interschool Football Championship for Girls held in Kastamonu, and repeated her achievement at the same competition the next year in Samsun.

As Eskişehirspor was relegated from the Women's First league, she transferred by October 2016 to Bozüyük Halk Eğitim Gençlik ve Spor club in the Third League. The following season, she moved to Eskişehir Öncü Spor ve Gençlik, which played also in the Third League. After three seasons in total in the Third League, she was signed by the İzmir-based club Konak Belediyespor in the 2019-20 season.

WFC Zhytlobud-1 Kharkiv 
On 23 February 2021, she moved to Ukraine and joined WFC Zhytlobud-1 Kharkiv to play in the Ukrainian Women's League.

Galatasaray 
On 1 February 2022, the Turkish Women's Football Super League team was transferred to the Galatasaray club.

International career 

She was called up to the Turkey girls' national U-15 team.

Sadıkoğlu debuted in the Turkey U-17 team appearing at the 2015 UEFA Women's Under-17 Championship qualification- Elite round match against Finland. She capped in all three games of the tournament. She scored two goals in the first match of the 2016 UEFA Women's Under-17 Championship qualification – Group 1 against Andorra.  She also played at the 2017 UEFA Women's Under-17 Championship qualification - Group 7 and the 2017 UEFA Development Cup matches. She scored in total six goals for the national U-17 team in 19 matches.

In 2017, she entered the Turkey women's U-19 team. She took part at the 2017 UEFA Women's Under-19 Championship qualification - Elite round, 2019 UEFA Women's Under-19 Championship qualification - Group 2 and Elite round matches. She capped 15 times and scored two goals.

On 11 November 2019, Sadıkoğlu debuted in the Turkey women's national team.

(†): Friendly matches not included

Career statistics 
.

Honours

Individual 
 Turkish Women's Third League
 Topscorer (41 goals) 2017-18 season with Eskişehir Öncü SG

References

External links 

2000 births
Living people
Sportspeople from Eskişehir
Turkish women's footballers
Women's association football midfielders
Turkey women's youth international footballers
Turkey women's international footballers
Eskişehirspor women's players
Konak Belediyespor players
Turkish expatriate women's footballers
Turkish expatriate sportspeople in Ukraine
Expatriate women's footballers in Ukraine
WFC Zhytlobud-1 Kharkiv players
Turkish Women's Football Super League players
Galatasaray S.K. women's football players
21st-century Turkish sportswomen